Out of Silence, released 1 September 2017, is the fourth solo album by New Zealand singer-songwriter, Neil Finn. The making of the album was livestreamed on Finn's Facebook page.

Critical reception
Metacritic rated the album as 84 out of 100. The New Zealand Herald described the album as "quietly astonishing" while The Music Australia rated it as 4 out of 5.

Singles
"More Than One of You" and "Second Nature" were released as the first and second singles on 11 and 18 August 2017, respectively.

Track listing
All songs were written by Neil Finn, except where noted.

"Love Is Emotional" – 3:32
"More Than One of You" - 2:53
"Chameleon Days" - 4:35
"Independence Day" - 3:48
"Alone" (Tim Finn, Mervyn Peake) - 3:08
"Widow's Peak" (Sharon Finn) - 3:25
"Second Nature" - 3:50
"The Law Is Always on Your Side" - 2:23
"Terrorise Me" - 4:13
"I Know Different" - 4:14

Personnel
Neil Finn: piano, vocals
Tim Finn: harmony vocals and acoustic guitar on "Alone"
Elroy Finn: drums, percussion, guitar
The Infinity Orchestra: strings
Choir: Amelia Murray, Don McGlashan, EJ Barnes, Harper Finn, Hollie Fullbrook, James Milne, Jimmy Metherell, Reb Fountain, Samuel Flynn Scott, Sandy Mill, Sean Donnelly
Victoria Kelly: string arrangements
David Squire: choir director
Sharon Finn: artwork
Steve Dykes: photography
Design: Anns Taylor

References 

EMI Records albums
Neil Finn albums
2017 albums
Albums recorded at Roundhead Studios